Boumdeid is a department of Assaba Region in Mauritania.

List of municipalities in the department 
The Boumdeid department is made up of following municipalities:

 Boumdeid
 Hsey Tin
 Laftah.

In 2000, the entire population of the Boumdeid Department has a total of 8 704  inhabitants  (4,328 men and  4,376 women).

References 

Departments of Mauritania